Soul Talk is an album by saxophonist Leo Wright featuring performances recorded in 1963 for the Atlantic label but not released until 1970 on their Vortex subsidiary.

Reception

AllMusic awarded the album 3 stars.

Track listing
All compositions by Leo Wright, except as indicated
 "State Trooper" (Gloria Coleman) - 2:38
 "Blue Leo" - 4:43
 "Sometimes I Feel Like a Motherless Child" (Traditional) - 4:29
 "Soul Talk" - 5:22
 "Poopsie's Minor" - 4:46
 "Skylark" (Hoagy Carmichael, Johnny Mercer) - 5:20
 "Blues Fanfare" - 6:28

Personnel 
Leo Wright - alto saxophone, flute
Gloria Coleman - organ
Kenny Burrell - guitar
Frankie Dunlop - drums

References 

1970 albums
Leo Wright albums
Vortex Records albums
Albums produced by Nesuhi Ertegun